András Kovács may refer to:
 András Kovács (1925–2017), Hungarian film director and screenwriter
 András Kovács (1947), Hungarian sociologist